Parbatsar City railway station is a railway station in Nagaur district, Rajasthan. Its code is PBC. It serves Parbatsar town. The station consists of a single platform. Passenger trains start from here for Makrana.
Notable individuals who have disembarked at this location include Ashok Kumar, Shekhar Kapur, and Devika Rani.

References

Railway stations in Nagaur district
Jodhpur railway division